Frederic Austin Ogg (February 8, 1878October 23, 1951) was an American political scientist.

Biography
Ogg was born at Solsberry, Indiana, in 1878. He graduated from DePauw University (Ph.B., 1899) and took post graduate courses at Indiana (A.M., 1900) and Harvard (A.M. in history, 1904, and Ph.D. in history, 1908) universities. After several years spent in teaching in high schools and colleges, he became associate professor of political science at the University of Wisconsin in 1914, and full professor in 1917. He was a member of many economic and historical societies.

He and Emma Virginia Perry were married in 1903.

Works
His literary work gave him a national reputation. He wrote for popular magazines, 17 books and was an editor of the American Political Science Review.  Among his works were:
Saxon and Slav (1903)
A Source Book of Mediæval History (1908)
Life of Daniel Webster (1914)
“National Progress 1907–1917” (The American Nation, Vol. 27, 1917)

References

External links

1878 births
1951 deaths
American political scientists
American political writers
American editors
University of Wisconsin–Madison faculty
DePauw University alumni
Indiana University Bloomington alumni
Harvard University alumni